Dr. E. H. Ward Farm is a historic home and farm located near Bynum, Chatham County, North Carolina. The main house was built in sections during the mid-19th through early-20th century beginning about 1840.  The earliest section is a -story, gable-roofed, two room log structure, that forms the rear of the main section.  The main section was built about 1870, and is a one-story, gable-roofed frame structure with a simple gable-front porch.  A one-story board-and-batten rear ell was added about 1900.  Also on the property are the contributing office of Dr. Ward, carriage house and gear room, board-and-batten barn and log cribs, smokehouse and pen, and a small brick well house.

It was listed on the National Register of Historic Places in 1985.

References

Houses on the National Register of Historic Places in North Carolina
Houses completed in 1840
Houses in Chatham County, North Carolina
National Register of Historic Places in Chatham County, North Carolina